Sundown Adventureland is a children's theme park in Rampton, Nottinghamshire, UK. It originally opened as a farmyard in 1968 and is owned by the Rhodes family. As of 2020, it has over 20 rides and attractions.

Park guide
The park has several themed areas, including fantasy, Wild West, pirate and fairytale themes.

History 
Sundown Adventureland first opened in 1968 and was ran in the Rhodes' back garden. In its first year open, it was visited by over 2000 people. Animals that could be seen during early operation included pheasants, ducks, bush babies, flying and red squirrels, budgerigars, canaries, a monkey, fox and a donkey. It was originally known as Sundown Pets Corner.

Awards
In 2020 Sundown Adventureland was voted the fourth-best theme park in the UK and the 16th best in Europe, according to TripAdvisor

References

External links

 

Tourist attractions in Nottinghamshire
Amusement parks in England